Laurs Østerby Skjellerup (born 12 August 2002) is a Danish professional footballer who plays as a forward for Danish 1st Division club Hobro IK.

Career

Randers
Skjellerup is a product of Randers FC and got his official debut on 28 June 2020 against AC Horsens in the Danish Superliga. Skjellerup started on the bench, before replacing Emil Riis Jakobsen in the 92nd minute. Skjellerup also came on the pitch against Esbjerg fB on 8 July 2020. In the 2020-19 and 2020-21 seasons, Skjellerup only played U-19 football for Randers.

Hobro IK
On 12 July 2022 it was confirmed, that Skjellerup had made a return to his former club, Danish 1st Division side Hobro IK, with Skjellerup signing a three-year deal.

References

External links

2002 births
Living people
Danish men's footballers
Association football forwards
People from Mariager
Sportspeople from the North Jutland Region
Hobro IK players
Randers FC players
Danish Superliga players
Danish 1st Division players